Sanggye-dong is a dong (neighbourhood) of Nowon-gu in Seoul, South Korea. It was founded in the 1960s by squatters and by the 1980s there were approximately 1,000 squatter households and 600 tenants. In 1985, it was declared a redevelopment zone. Most people left and some resisted before being evicted forcibly.

See also 
Administrative divisions of South Korea

References

Further reading

External links
 Nowon-gu Official site in English
 Map of Nowon-gu
 Nowon-gu Official site
 Sanggye 1-dong Resident office

Neighbourhoods of Nowon District
Squats